This article lists the squads for the 2016 FIFA U-17 Women's World Cup, held in Jordan. Each competing federation submitted a 21-player squad to FIFA, which was published on 24 September 2016.

Group A

Jordan
Coach:  Robbie Johnson

Spain
Coach: Toña Is

Mexico
Coach: Christopher Cuéllar

New Zealand
Coach: Gareth Turbull

Group B

Venezuela
Coach:  Kenneth Zseremata

Germany
Coach: Anouschka Bernhard

Cameroon
Head coach: Minkreo Birwe

Canada
Coach:  Beverly Priestman

Group C

Nigeria
Coach: Nikyu Bala

Brazil
Coach: Luizão

England
Coach:  John Griffiths

North Korea
Coach: Jong Bok Sin

Group D

United States
Coach: Brian Snow

Paraguay
Coach: Nelson Basualdo

Ghana
Coach:  Evans Adotey

Japan
Coach: Naoki Kusunose

References 

2016
2016 in association football